Shankar Salim Simon is a 1978 Indian Tamil-language masala film directed by P. Madhavan. It stars Vijayakumar as Shankar, Jai Ganesh as Salim and Rajinikanth as Simon. The film was inspired by the 1977 Hindi film Amar Akbar Anthony, and was released on 10 February 1978.

Plot 

Simon and Salim come from lower class, while Shankar and his sister are the children of a corrupt businessman. Latha falls in love with Simon, while Shankar falls in love with Alamelu and Salim is already married. In different circumstances, Latha is forced to marry a man, but she runs away from him and lives with Simon. The society goes against both Simon and Latha and in the end, Latha explains about how worse the man she is married to and unites with Simon.

Cast 

Vijayakumar as Shankar
Manjula as Alamelu
Rajinikanth as Simon
Latha as Vasanthi
Jai Ganesh as Salim
 M. S. Vasanthi as Mumtaz
V. S. Raghavan as Sadhasivam
S. V. Ramadas as Jaipal
Suruli Rajan as Kabali
Y. G. Parthasarathy as Vedhachalam
Y. G. Mahendran as Mahesh
Manorama as Mariyamma
Peeli Sivam as Razak Bhai
Vellai Subbaiah as Liquor Seller

Production 
Shankar Salim Simon was adapted from the 1977 Hindi film Amar Akbar Anthony, but only retained the concept of the three title characters belonging to different religions of India: Hinduism, Islam and Christianity.

Soundtrack 
All songs were written by Kannadasan and composed by M. S. Viswanathan.

References

External links 
 

1970s masala films
1970s Tamil-language films
1978 films
Films scored by M. S. Viswanathan
Indian black-and-white films
Tamil remakes of Hindi films
Films directed by P. Madhavan